This article contains information about the literary events and publications of 1739.

Events
January 16 – George Frideric Handel's oratorio Saul is first performed at the King's Theatre, Haymarket, London.
February 9 – The Scots Magazine first appears.
February 17 – George Whitefield first preaches in the open air, to miners at Kingswood, South Gloucestershire, England.
March 16 – Henry Brooke's drama Gustavus Vasa becomes the first play banned under the Licensing Act 1737.
April – John Wesley first preaches in the open air, at Whitefield's invitation.
November – The Champion (periodical) is launched, with Henry Fielding (under the name Captain Hercules Vinegar) as editor.
unknown date – The first Bible in the Estonian language, Piibli Ramat, translated by Anton thor Helle, is published.

New books

Prose
Penelope Aubin – A Collection of Entertaining Histories and Novels
John Campbell – The Travels and Adventures of Edward Bevan, Esq., formerly a merchant in London
Elizabeth Carter 
Examination of Mr. Pope's Essay on Man (translation of De Crousaz's Examen de l'essai de Monsieur Pope sur l'homme)
Sir Isaac Newton's Philosophy Explain'd for the Use of Ladies (translation of Algarotti's Newtonianismo per le donne)
Philip Doddridge – The Family Expositor
Richard Glover – London
David Hume (anonymously) – A Treatise of Human Nature (issued late 1738 but dated this year)
William Law – The Grounds and Reasons of Christian Regeneration
John Mottley (as Elijah Jenkins) – Joe Miller's Jests; or, the Wits Vade-Mecum
Robert Nugent (attributed) – An Epistle to Sir Robert Walpole
John Oldmixon – The History of England during the Reigns of Henry VIII, Edward VI, Queen Mary, Queen Elizabeth
Laetitia Pilkington – The Statues
Samuel Richardson – Aesop's Fables
Elizabeth Singer Rowe – Miscellaneous Works
Thomas Sheridan – The Satires of Juvenal Translated
Joseph Trapp – The Nature, Folly, Sin, and Danger, of Being Righteous Over-much (against George Whitefield)
Voltaire 
De la Gloire, ou entretien avec un Chinois
Conseils a M. Helvetius
Isaac Watts – The World to Come
George Whitefield – A Continuation of the Reverend Mr. Whitefield's Journal
Paul Whitehead – Manners

Drama
Daniel Bellamy – Miscellanies in Prose and Verse
Henry Brooke – Gustavus Vasa
 Anthony Brown – The Fatal Retirement
Henry Carey – Nancy (opera)
Thomas Cooke – The Mournful Nuptials (not acted)
David Mallet – Mustapha
James Miller – An Hospital for Fools
Edward Phillips – Britons, Strike Home
William Shirley – The Parricide
James Thomson – Edward and Eleonora

Poetry

Moses Browne – Poems
Mary Collier – The Woman's Labour: an epistle to Mr Stephen Duck
Mikhail Lomonosov – Ode on the Taking of Khotin from the Turks
Robert Nugent 
An Ode on Mr. Pulteney
An Ode, to His Royal Highness on His Birthday
Odes and Epistles
Jonathan Swift – Verses on the Death of Dr. Swift
John Wesley – Hymns and Sacred Poems

Births
January – Twm o'r Nant, Welsh playwright and poet (died 1810)
August 31 – Johann Augustus Eberhard, German theologian and philosopher (died 1809)
November 20 – Jean-François de la Harpe, French critic (died 1803)
unknown date – Hugh Kelly, Irish-born dramatist and poet (died 1777)

Deaths
June 20 – Edmond Martène, French historian (born 1654)
July 25 – Johann Christoph Wolf, German Hebrew scholar and bibliographer (born 1683)
September 4 – George Lillo, English dramatist and actor (born 1691)
October 18 – António José da Silva, Brazilian dramatist (born 1705)
probable – Liu Zhi (劉智), Chinese Muslim scholar (born c. 1660)

References

 
Years of the 18th century in literature